Darnhall may refer to:
Darnhall, the village in Cheshire
Darnhall Mains, the farm and settlement near Eddleston in the Scottish Borders
A name used historically for the tower house Black Barony near Eddleston in the Scottish Borders